Apterichtus monodi is a species of snake eel native to the eastern Atlantic Ocean where it is found along the African coast from Senegal to Nigeria.  It can be found at depths of from  where it digs burrows into sandy or muddy substrates of the continental shelf.  This species can reach a length of  TL.

References

Fish described in 1966
monodi